The black-throated canary (Crithagra atrogularis), also known as the black-throated seedeater, is a species of finch in the family Fringillidae.

Distribution
It is found frequently in Angola, Botswana, Burundi, Republic of the Congo, Democratic Republic of the Congo, Gabon, Kenya, Lesotho, Namibia, Rwanda, South Africa, Tanzania, Uganda, Zambia, and Zimbabwe.
Its natural habitats are subtropical or tropical dry forest, dry savanna, and subtropical or tropical dry shrubland.

Taxonomy
The black-throated canary was formerly placed in the genus Serinus but phylogenetic analysis using mitochondrial and nuclear DNA sequences found that the genus was polyphyletic. The genus was therefore split and a number of species including the black-throated canary were moved to the resurrected genus Crithagra.

References

External links
 Black-throated canary - Species text in The Atlas of Southern African Birds.

black-throated canary
Birds of Southern Africa
Birds of Sub-Saharan Africa
black-throated canary
black-throated canary
Taxonomy articles created by Polbot